Myeloconis erumpens is a species of corticolous (bark-dwelling), crustose lichen in the family Trichotheliaceae. It is found in Papua New Guinea, north-eastern Australia and New Caledonia. The lichen was formally described as a new species in 1996 by Patrick M. McCarthy and John Elix. The species epithet erumpens refers to the distinctive thallus of the lichen, which has exposed patches and "eruptions" of yellow medulla that are visible against the brownish thallus.

References

Gyalectales
Lichen species
Lichens described in 1996
Taxa named by John Alan Elix
Lichens of Australia
Lichens of New Caledonia
Lichens of New Guinea